The following is a list of regional organizations by population.

List

References

External links
United Nations Analytical Report for the 2004 revision of World Population Prospects – includes details of methodology and sources used for the population estimates above.
Population clocks & projected growth charts for all countries
Population clock

Regional organizations